Christopher John Wilson (born November 18, 1980) is an American auto racing team owner and former professional baseball pitcher. Wilson pitched in Major League Baseball (MLB) for the Texas Rangers from 2005 to 2011 and the Los Angeles Angels of Anaheim from  2012 to 2015. He is the founder and owner of sports car team CJ Wilson Racing, which competes in IMSA Michelin Pilot Challenge full-time and WeatherTech SportsCar Championship part-time.

College
After attending Fountain Valley High School (graduating in 1998), Wilson played at Santa Ana College where in 2000 he was named the MVP of the Orange Empire Conference, and awarded the California Junior College Co-Player of the Year award. Wilson played outfield, first base, starting pitcher, and relief pitcher at Loyola Marymount University during the 2001 season.

Wilson was drafted by the Rangers in the fifth round (141st overall) of the 2001 MLB draft.

Professional career

Texas Rangers
After starting the 2001 season in Pulaski of the Appalachian League he was promoted to Class A with the Savannah Sand Gnats. He moved through High-A Charlotte (Florida State League) and into Double-A Tulsa (Texas League) by late 2002.

For 2003, Wilson returned to Double-A with Frisco RoughRiders of the Texas League, earning Pitcher of the Week honors in May. His up and down season was cut short due to injury which resulted in season-ending Tommy John surgery on August 12.

After missing all of 2004 due to the elbow injury, Wilson was able to return to Double-A in 2005 before being called up to the majors later that season. He posted a 1–7 record and 6.94 ERA in 24 games during his rookie campaign with the Rangers. Later in the season, Texas placed him in the bullpen full-time where he went 1–2 with a 2.73 ERA in 18 relief appearances.

He started the 2006 season on the 15-day disabled list with a strained hamstring before returning to the team going 1–2 with a 5.16 ERA with the Rangers before getting optioned to Triple-A on June 1. While in the minors, he went 1–0 with a 2.45 ERA with two saves, and in 11 innings, he struck out 17 and walked five in nine appearances. After being recalled July 18, Wilson ended the season strong, posting second half numbers of a 3.29 ERA in  innings and 27 appearances and ending the season as the team's top left-handed setup man, posting a 2–4 record and 4.06 ERA overall for Texas. He proved especially tough against lefties, with an ERA of 1.77 with 19 strikeouts in  innings.

Following the trade of Éric Gagné, Wilson was used to close out games for the Rangers in 2007 converting his first 11 consecutive chances. Overall, he finished with career bests in: ERA (3.03), appearances (66), innings (68.1), strikeouts (63), WHIP (1.21), holds (15), and opposing batting average (.208).

He was named the Rangers closer for the 2008 season. He had a 6.06 ERA and converted 24 of 28 save opportunities.

In 2009, Wilson returned to role of set-up man as Frank Francisco was named the closer. He set new career bests in: wins (5), innings (73.2), appearances (74), ERA (2.81), strikeouts (84), K/BB ratio (2.61), holds (19), home runs allowed (3) as well as recording 14 saves throughout the year and set a team record for the lowest home ERA for a single season (0.67).

In 2010, Wilson returned to his past role as a starting pitcher with Texas. Wilson had expressed an interest in returning to the rotation as early as 2006 and was told to report to spring training in condition to start. Early conjecture amongst sports writers and fans covering the Rangers spring training debated if Wilson would actually be able to earn a spot in the rotation. After making several impressive spring starts pitching coach Mike Maddux was asked if Wilson was making the rotation a tough call to which Maddux said, "He's making it a great call." Wilson was named the third starting pitcher in the rotation behind Scott Feldman and Rich Harden.

At the end of April, Wilson was leading the Rangers rotation with an ERA of 1.76 after 4 starts, fourth best in the AL. On May 7 against the Kansas City Royals, Wilson threw a complete game winning 4–1. It was Wilson's second credited complete game of the year and career, the previous being a rain-shortened six-inning loss to the Yankees. Wilson set 2 club records after his May 13 start against the A's with the most consecutive innings without a home run and most consecutive quality starts to start a season. Wilson gave up his first home run on May 19 against the Angels' Torii Hunter after  innings dating back from 2009. Wilson's consecutive quality starts also ended in the same game.

Wilson led the team in wins and ERA while throwing more than 200 innings. He was named the second starter behind Cliff Lee for the playoffs.

In Wilson's first playoff game, he pitched 6.1 innings allowing no runs on two hits, seven strikeouts, and two walks in a 6–0 win in Game 2 against the Tampa Rays in the American League Divisional playoff series. He threw 104 pitches supported by an Ian Kinsler home run and RBI single and a Michael Young 3-run home run in the fifth.

Wilson started the ALCS for the Rangers and pitched seven innings allowing three runs and six hits.

Wilson is just the sixth player in major league baseball history to go eight straight postseason starts without recording a victory.

Wilson was a 2011 American League All Star. After the Rangers clinched the AL West on September 23, manager Ron Washington announced Wilson would be the team's ALDS game one starting pitcher.

In 2011, Wilson was 16–7 with a 2.94 ERA (seventh in the AL). He led the league in games started (34), and was fourth in wins, fifth in win–loss percentage (.696), and sixth in strikeouts (206; sixth-most in Rangers history).

Los Angeles Angels of Anaheim
On December 8, 2011 Wilson agreed to a five-year, $77.5 million deal with the Los Angeles Angels of Anaheim. This deal came only hours after Albert Pujols signed a record breaking ten-year, $250 million deal with Anaheim. The contract became official on December 10.

On May 22, 2012, Wilson and Ernesto Frieri pitched a combined one-hit shutout against the Oakland Athletics in Oakland, a place Wilson said that he strongly disliked pitching while with the Texas Rangers. Wilson struck out seven and allowed two walks while giving up a single. He was selected to the All-Star Game in 2012 after going 9–5 with a 2.43 ERA for the Angels. He finished the season with a 13–10 record in 34 starts. He followed the 2012 season with another successful season, winning a career high 17 games while lowering his ERA from the prior season to 3.39.

Despite the team making the playoffs in 2014, Wilson did not have a good season, finishing with an ERA of 4.51 and leading the majors in walks with 85. Due to his high pitch counts, Wilson averaged less than 6 innings per start. Wilson's season was cut short in 2015, starting only 21 games before going out with an elbow injury in early August. He opted for elbow surgery.

He started the 2016 season on the disabled list recovering from elbow and shoulder surgery. On July 5, it was announced that Wilson would undergo season-ending shoulder surgery, ending his career.

Pitching technique
Wilson's pitching repertoire included a four-seam fastball (90–93 mph), a two-seam fastball (90–93), a cutter (88–91), slider (83–85), curveball (77–80), and changeup (84–87), thrown from a 3/4 arm angle. He hardly ever threw his changeup against left-handed hitters, while his slider was much more commonly used against lefties.

Wilson said he attempted to keep his opponents' batting average on balls in play down by "using [my] pitch mix a certain way" and by taking into account his defense's alignment when he pitches.

Personal life and beliefs
Wilson is a devoted Taoist (converted from Christianity)  and adheres to a Straight Edge way of life (abstaining from alcohol, illegal drugs, tobacco, and promiscuous sex in order to maintain health). As a sign of his choice of being Straight Edge, Wilson has the words "Straight Edge" tattooed along the length of his torso, Japanese characters on his shoulder that read "Poison Free" and "XXX" stitched on his blue glove as a straight edge symbol. The blue glove is itself unusual among baseball players (who generally wear a traditional brown-colored glove). Wilson wore the blue glove when the Rangers wore their blue uniforms (or their road grey uniforms); he also had a similarly decorated red glove when pitching in games where the Rangers wore red uniforms. Wilson used a black glove, a brown glove, and at least one other red glove while playing for the Angels, all of which bore the same embroidery. During his time on the Angels, he also used a bright-blue glove with red lacing that was embroidered with "X C.J. X", where the use of the letter X surrounding his name similarly represents his straight edge lifestyle.

Wilson is highly interested in conservative politics, which he said is in stark contrast to other Major League baseball players. His characterizations of typical ballplayers in this same interview and some of his posts on the blog lonestarball.com generated minor controversy within the Rangers' clubhouse.

Wilson races racecars in his free time, and has mentioned he aims to be a professional racer after his baseball career; he also is highly interested in cars, having a collection of Porsches as well as a custom painted McLaren P1. Wilson won the E1 class in the 2010 25 Hours of Thunderhill. He races a Mazda MX-5 in club races and owns a race team that competes in the professional Global MX-5 Cup series. He also is the General Manager of Porsche Fresno and raced in the 2018 Pikes Peak International Hill Climb.

Wilson married Brazilian model Lisalla Montenegro on December 15, 2013, in Laguna Beach, California. They have two daughters.

Wilson is the co-host of 'The Throttle Dogs' podcast.

Wilson is an investor in the cryptocurrency Bitcoin.  He has appeared on multiple podcasts with prominent Bitcoin podcasters including Peter McCormack’s 'What Bitcoin Did' and Jimmy song’s 'Bitcoin Fixes This'.

References

External links

 
 C. J. Wilson's MySpace

1980 births
Living people
Major League Baseball pitchers
Baseball players from California
Loyola Marymount Lions baseball players
Texas Rangers players
Los Angeles Angels players
Pulaski Rangers players
Savannah Sand Gnats players
Charlotte Rangers players
Tulsa Drillers players
Frisco RoughRiders players
Bakersfield Blaze players
Oklahoma RedHawks players
American Taoists
American bloggers
Sportspeople from Newport Beach, California
American League All-Stars
American former Christians
Arkansas Travelers players
Santa Ana Dons baseball players
Sports car racing team owners